Lunyakinsky is a rural locality (a khutor) in Rechenskoye Rural Settlement, Alexeyevsky District, Volgograd Oblast, Russia. The population was 31 as of 2010.

Geography 
Lunyakinsky is located on the right bank of the Akishevka River, 26 km southwest of Alexeyevskaya (the district's administrative centre) by road. Ust-Buzulukskaya is the nearest rural locality.

References 

Rural localities in Alexeyevsky District, Volgograd Oblast